Gerhard H. Schwedes (born April 23, 1938) is a former American football halfback who played two seasons in the American Football League with the Boston Patriots and New York Titans. He was drafted by the Baltimore Colts in the fourth round of the 1960 NFL Draft. Schwedes was also a territorial pick of the Boston Patriots in 1960. He played college football at Syracuse University, which he helped to a victory in the 1960 Cotton Bowl Classic, and attended Hunterdon Central Regional High School in Flemington, New Jersey. Schwedes' son Scott also played football at Syracuse and later in the NFL.

References

External links
Just Sports Stats
College stats

1938 births
Living people
Sportspeople from Freiburg im Breisgau
German players of American football
American football halfbacks
Hunterdon Central Regional High School alumni
Syracuse Orange football players
New York Titans (AFL) players
Boston Patriots players
German emigrants to the United States